Polyclitus was an influential freedman in the court of the Roman emperor Nero. He was sent to Britain in 60 or 61 AD to head an enquiry in the aftermath of the rebellion of Boudica. As a result the governor, Gaius Suetonius Paulinus, was relieved of his command and replaced by Publius Petronius Turpilianus.

Polyclitus was put to death by Galba in 68.

References

1st-century Romans
Ancient Romans in Britain
Emperor's slaves and freedmen
68 deaths
Year of birth unknown
People executed by the Roman Empire